Marlon Zanotelli (born 19 June 1988) is a Brazilian equestrian. He competed in the individual jumping event at the 2020 Summer Olympics.

References

External links
 

1988 births
Living people
Brazilian male equestrians
Olympic equestrians of Brazil
Equestrians at the 2020 Summer Olympics
Show jumping riders
People from Imperatriz
Pan American Games medalists in equestrian
Sportspeople from Maranhão
Pan American Games gold medalists for Brazil
Equestrians at the 2019 Pan American Games
Medalists at the 2019 Pan American Games
20th-century Brazilian people
21st-century Brazilian people